Princess Hejing may refer to:

Princess Hejing (1731–1792), Qianlong Emperor's third daughter
Princess Hejing (1756–1775), Qianlong Emperor's seventh daughter